Mission Capital Advisors is an American loan sale advisory firm.  It specializes in representing banks , investment funds, non-bank lenders and mortgage companies on the sale of performing, sub-performing and non-performing commercial and residential loans and loan portfolios, including defaulted loans from CMBS securitizations for special servicers These sales are intended to help banks reduce non-performing assets or manage their balance sheet.

Mission Capital uses an online auction process supported by a virtual data room.

Mission Capital expanded in 2009, in response to the growing credit crunch.

References

Sources 
1. “WaMu selling $140B portfolio to Wells Fargo; Q2 earnings fall" http://seattle.bizjournals.com/seattle/stories/2006/07/17/daily25.html
2. "CMBS Market Rises From Ashes of Collapse" https://www.wsj.com/articles/SB10001424052748704723604575379543602271202

Financial services companies of the United States